The vermiculated screech owl (Megascops vermiculatus), is a species of owl in the family Strigidae. It is found in Costa Rica, Nicaragua, and Panama.

Taxonomy and systematics

The taxonomy of the vermiculated screech owl is somewhat unsettled. The International Ornithological Committee (IOC) recognizes it as a distinct monotypic species. However, the North American Classification Committee of the American Ornithological Society (AOS/NACC)) and the Clements taxonomy treat it as a subspecies of the Middle American screech owl (M. guatemalae). What is now the foothill screech owl (M. roraimae) was once considered a subspecies of the vermiculated screech owl.

Description

It is dimorphic, with one morph brown and the other overall rufous. Unlike most other owls of the same genus, it has feathered feet. The brown morph has a light brown facial disc with a thin dark border, indistinct pale brows over yellow eyes, and short dark "ear" tufts. Its crown and upperparts range from grayish brown to buffy brown with fine uniform vermiculations. The underparts are whitish with dense fine brown and black vermiculation. The beak is gray-green. The rufous morph is bright rufous on its head and upperparts.

Distribution and habitat

The vermiculated screech-owl is found from far southern Nicaragua through the Caribbean side of Costa Rica into western Panama.

Behavior

Feeding

Almost nothing is known about the vermiculated screech owl's hunting practices or diet. It is presumed to mostly eat large insects but also small vertebrates.

Breeding

The vermiculated screech owl's breeding phenology is also very poorly known. It nests in a natural tree cavity or abandoned woodpecker hole, apparently in March. The clutch size is thought to be three.

Vocalization

The vermiculated screech owl's primary song is a "very fast, long, toad-like trill". Its probable secondary song is "a very brief descending purr".

Status

The IUCN has assessed the vermiculated screech owl as being of Least Concern. However, because it needs unbroken forest, "[f]orest destruction a threat, at least in long term."

References

Further reading

 König, C., F. Weick & J.H. Becking (2008) Owls of the World. Christopher Helm, London, 

vermiculated screech owl
Birds of Costa Rica
Birds of Panama
Birds of Nicaragua
vermiculated screech owl
Taxa named by Robert Ridgway